Billie Jean King won in the final 6–3, 6–4 against Rosie Casals.

Draw

External links
 1971 BMC Invitational Draw

1971 Women's Tennis Circuit